Ginesa Ortega Cortés (Metz, 1967) is a Spanish flamenco singer.

Although she was born in France, this Romani singer moved to Cornellá de Llobregat when she was a baby. She has collaborated with many artists and institutions, such as Teatre Lliure Orchestra, La Fura dels Baus or Joan Manuel Serrat.

Discography
Siento (1997).
Oscuriá (1999).
Por los espejos del agua (2002).
Flamenca (2006).
El amor brujo (2011)

External links 
www.myspace.com

1967 births
Living people
Musicians from Catalonia
Flamenco singers
Spanish Romani people
French emigrants to Spain

Romani singers